Philip Strong Humphrey (26 February 1926, Hibbing, Minnesota – 13 November 2009, Lawrence, Kansas) was an ornithologist, museum curator, and professor of zoology.

Philip S. Humphrey grew up in Litchfield, Connecticut and from an early age was interested in birds. In Litchfield, Duryea Morton (1924–2019) was a childhood friend who encouraged Humphrey's ornithological interests. After graduating from Litchfield's Forman School, Humphrey matriculated at Amherst College and graduated there in 1949 after serving in the U.S. Army Air Forces from 1944 to 1947. He then attended the University of Michigan, where he received in 1955 his Ph.D. in zoology. His doctoral thesis was "on the anatomy and systematic biology of the sea-ducks (Mergini)." For the two academic years 1955–1956 and 1956–1957 he worked in the University of Michigan's Museum of Zoology.

From 1957 to 1962 at Yale University, Humphrey was an assistant professor of zoology, as well as an assistant curator of ornithology at Yale's Peabody Museum of Natural History, where S. Dillon Ripley was the director. In 1959 Humphrey and Kenneth C. Parkes published an important paper on molts and plumages. In 1959 Humphrey conducted field studies in Haiti. He was a Guggenheim Fellow for the academic year 1959–1960. For the academic year 1960–1961 he studied birds in Argentina. For three months in late 1960 in Patagonia, he worked with Roger Tory Peterson.

In June 1962 Humphrey became the Curator of the Division of Birds at the National Museum of Natural History administered by the Smithsonian Institution. From 1965 to 1967, he chaired the National Museum's Department of Vertebrate Zoology. While working for the Smithsonian Institution, he was the principal investigator for the Pacific Ocean Biological Survey Program, which lasted from 1962 to 1969. In 1967 he left the Smithsonian Institution to become a professor at the University of Kansas, but he continued as the principal investigator for the Survey and, as a research associate, retained a connection with the Smithsonian Institution.

At the University of Kansas, he was the director of the University of Kansas's Natural History Museum and a professor in the Department of Zoology, which he also chaired. In 1969 he also became a professor in the newly formed Department of Systematics and Ecology. He retired as professor emeritus in 1995. In 1981 he, together with Max C. Thompson, identified a new species of steamer-duck, named by them Tachyeres leucocephalus. Humphrey was the author or co-author of nearly 100 articles.

He was elected a Fellow of the American Association for the Advancement of Science in 1981.

He married Mary Louise Countryman on 1 January 1946. Upon his death he was survived by his widow, a daughter, a son, three grandchildren, and four great-grandchildren.

Selected publications

References

External links

1926 births
2009 deaths
People from Litchfield, Connecticut
People from Hibbing, Minnesota
American ornithologists
American curators
Directors of museums in the United States
20th-century American zoologists
21st-century American zoologists
Amherst College alumni
University of Michigan alumni
Yale University faculty
University of Kansas faculty
Fellows of the American Association for the Advancement of Science